Sanam is a super-yacht launched 2015 at the Palmer Johnson shipyard in Sturgeon Bay and delivered the next year. She is currently not available for charter.

Sanam has two sisterships named DB9 and Bliss.

Design 
Both the materials of the hull and the superstructure are made out of Aluminium with teak laid decks. The yacht is classed by Lloyd's Register and flagged in the Cayman Islands.

See also
 Bliss
 DB9
 Luxury yacht
 List of motor yachts by length
 List of yachts built by Palmer Johnson

References 

2016 ships
Motor yachts
Ships built in the United States